The 22d Air Defense Missile Squadron is an inactive United States Air Force unit. It was last assigned to the 20th Air Division of Aerospace Defense Command, stationed near Langley Air Force Base, Virginia, where it was inactivated on 31 October 1972.  The squadron was activated in 1959 and equipped with BOMARC missiles for the air defense of the area near its base.

History

The squadron was activated at Langley Air Force Base, Virginia on 1 September 1959 as the 22d Air Defense Missile Squadron (BOMARC) and stood alert during the Cold War, equipped with IM-99 (later CIM-10) BOMARC surface to air antiaircraft missiles.  The squadron was tied into the Washington Semi-Automatic Ground Environment (SAGE) direction center which used analog computers to process information from ground radars, picket ships and airborne aircraft to accelerate the display of tracking data at the direction center to quickly direct the missile battery to engage hostile aircraft. The 22d was inactivated on 31 October 1972.

Although geographically separated from the base, it received administrative and logistical support from Langley.

Lineage
 Constituted as the 22d Air Defense Missile Squadron on 10 July 1959
 Activated on 1 September 1959
 Inactivated on 31 October 1972

Assignments
 Washington Air Defense Sector, 1 September 1959
 33d Air Division, 1 April 1966
 20th Air Division, 19 November 1969 – 31 October 1972

Awards
 
 Air Force Outstanding Unit Award
 1 September 1963 – 28 February 1965

See also
 List of United States Air Force missile squadrons

References

Bibliography

 
 
 

 Further reading
 

022
0022
Air defense squadrons of the United States Air Force
Military units and formations established in 1959
Military units and formations of the United States in the Cold War